Alvin Wayne Andrews (born July 10, 1945) is a former professional American football linebacker in the National Football League. He played for the Buffalo Bills in 1970 and 1971.

External links
Pro-Football reference

1945 births
Living people
Players of American football from Oakland, California
American football linebackers
Buffalo Bills players